Ianstown (Scottish Gaelic: Baile Iain) is a small village on the Moray Firth in Scotland. It lies within the council area of Moray.

The town of Buckie lies to the west of Ianstown.

Villages in Moray
Buckie